Urpo Sivula (born 15 March 1988) is a Finnish professional volleyball player. During the 2008 season he played in the Finland Volleyball league team Pielaveden Sampo. Sivula plays wing-spiker.

Junior years
Sivula started his career with his friends at seven years old. His first team was Kurun Ryhti, from Kuru. Soon his talent began to be recognized and Sivula started to play in Virtain Veikot, where he won two Finland Junior Championships.

When Sivula turned sixteen he moved to Kuortane. There he started study and training with the best junior players in Finland. For two years he lived in Kuortane and played third highest level in Finland during the 2004–2005 season, and second highest level in Finland during the 2005–2006 season. He became Finland's junior team captain in 2004, and also he played on the Finland national team with boys two years older than he. There he became friends with Mikko and Matti Oivanen, Simo-Pekka Olli and Konstantin Shumov.

National team
Before Sivula played a game in the Finland league he got a call from the men's national team head coach, Mauro Berruto. Berruto wanted Sivula to join his team immediately. Sivula started to play in the men's national team at the age of 18. His first national team game in Finland caused a sensation. Sivula entered the court during a crucial point in the game, hit two points, and Finland won the first game ever in the volleyball world league. The whole summer Sivula played in the national team, and helped them earn a place in the European Championships.

Sensation in Moscow
In the European Championships 2007 Sivula and the Finland national team played amazing volleyball. The team beat World Championships silver medalists Poland, and World Championships bronze medalists Bulgaria. Finland lost only two games, and both in medal games. Finland played against Spain to the final, but it lost to Spain. Sivula played in World League 2008 with Finland. He was one of the leading players on the team that whole summer. He made his breakthrough in the Finland national team.

Finland league

After Sivula played on the national team during summer 2006, all the teams at Finland's highest level wanted Sivula. Finally Sivula signed a contract with Pielaveden Sampo. The contract lasted two years, with a third optional year. The first season in the league Sivula was recognized as one of the best players in the league. He won with Sampo Finland Cup-Champion, and played himself CEV-Cup quarterfinal. In the Finland league Sampo lost its final division game against Rovaniemen Santasport. Finals were some of the best ever seen in the Finland league. After the season Sivula was chosen as the best newcomer in the league.

Sivula started his second league season in Finland with big expectations. The media expected that Sivula would be the ultimate discovery in the league. In the first game that season Sivula played amazing volleyball. The Finnish media described the game as the "Sivula show." In the international court Sivula also played well. Against the Italian A1-league team Roma Volley, Sivula was the best spiker of both teams on the court.

During the  2007–2008 season Sampo played in the Challenge Cup quarterfinal; there they had a narrow loss against Russian Superleague team Lokomotiv Ekaterinburg. Sampo won again in the Finland cup-championship, but in the league they lost again to Rovaniemen Santasport in finals. That was a big disappointment for Sivula and Sampo.

After the season Sivula received many prizes. Finland's biggest newspaper, Ilta-Sanomat recognized him as the best player in the league. Finland's favourite volleyball site, hotsport.info, also chose Sivula as the best player in the league, and in the all-stars team. Also Sport Channel chose him for the All-Star team. During the 2008–09 season Sivula started in Pielaveden Sampo. He led his team to the Finland Cup-finals. The final game was his last game in Finland. He was named the best player of the game. After the game he signed a contract with the Galatasaray volleyball club of Turkey.

Sivula changed Turkey league after his first season to Italian volleyball league. There his coach was Mauro Berruto, who coached also in Finnish volleyball national team.

Awards
Club:
 Finland league silver 2007, 2008
 Finland cup 2006, 2007, 2008
 Fourth place in Men's European Championships 2007

Personal:
 Ilta-Sanomat chose best player in Finland league 2008
 Sport Channel All-Stars team 2008
 Year youth player 2006, 2007
 Best newcomer in Finland league 2007
 Third best server in Finland league 2007

References

External links
 (English) Fansite

1988 births
Living people
Finnish men's volleyball players
Galatasaray S.K. (men's volleyball) players
Finnish expatriate sportspeople in Turkey
Finnish expatriates in Italy
Sportspeople from Pirkanmaa